NextGen Jane is a data-driven women’s healthcare company known for inventing a smart tampon system that offers insight into a woman's reproductive health system.

History
In 2013, co-founder Ridhi Tariyal was part of the first class of the Blavatnik Fellowship at Harvard University. The purpose of the fellowship is to place recent MBA graduates in labs across Harvard with the goal of commercializing life science-based enterprises.

Coming out of the fellowship, Tariyal and co-founder Stephen Gire developed intellectual property for a Smart Tampon System to gather genomic information about a woman’s health. In the menstrual blood, they think will find early markers of endometriosis and, ultimately, a variety of other disorders. The surgeons diagnose endometriosis by inserting a small camera into the pelvic cavity to look for endometrial cells in places other than the lining of the uterus. When wayward cells are found, the diseased tissue can be removed. But this process is it is uncomfortable and impractical for women’s daily lives. So, the method of analyzing the menstrual blood retained in the tampons aims to improve the diagnostic index of these diseases.

NextGen Jane was founded in 2014 with this IP as its core patent technology, and its headquarters are located in Oakland, California, United States. Initially, the company had nothing to do with a tampon.  It was about fertility and empowering women to manage their own reproductive health by themselves. Later on, the tampon aspect was added to help women manage their reproductive healthcare much better.

Products and services
NextGen Jane offers insight into women's reproductive health through its Smart Tampon System - a device that can help track biological changes in a woman’s body and enables them to manage their healthcare more autonomously.

References

American companies established in 2014
Companies based in Oakland, California
Health care companies based in California
Women's health